Vice Admiral Barry Michael Costello (born January 31, 1951) is an American navy officer who served as commander of Third Fleet of the United States Navy from May 2005 to May 2007.

Biography
Costello was born in Rutland, Vermont, the son of Bartley Costello, a lawyer, and Catherine (née O'Brien). He is of Irish descent. He attended College of the Holy Cross and was commissioned an ensign through the NROTC Program in 1973. Costello, by then a vice admiral, reported as commander of the Third Fleet in May 2005 following a tour as chief of legislative affairs.

His sea tours include: navigator in Brownson; weapons officer in Whipple; operations officer of Destroyer Squadron Five; executive officer in Harry W. Hill; commanding officer in Elliot; assistant chief of staff for operations, Third Fleet; commander, Destroyer Squadron 23; commander, Cruiser Destroyer Group One, Constellation Strike Group commander, and commander of Task Force 55 during Operation Iraqi Freedom. 

He attended Albany Law School, where he earned a Juris Doctor degree and is currently a member of the New York State Bar. He also attended the College of Naval Command and Staff, where he was selected as honor graduate, graduating "With Distinction," and earned a Master of Arts degree in foreign affairs. Additionally, he has participated in the National Security program at John F. Kennedy School of Government at Harvard University. 

Costello's primary shore assignments include: joint planner in the Operational and Interoperability Directorate (J7), the Joint Staff, and principal deputy for senate liaison in the navy's Office of Legislative Affairs; and deputy director for strategy and policy (J5), the Joint Staff.

Awards and decorations
Costello's personal decorations include: the Defense Distinguished Service Medal, the Navy Distinguished Service Medal, the Legion of Merit with two gold stars, the Bronze Star, the Defense Meritorious Service Medal, the Meritorious Service Medal with two gold stars, and the Navy Commendation Medal with gold star.

  Defense Distinguished Service Medal
  Navy Distinguished Service Medal
  Legion of Merit with two gold stars
  Bronze Star
  Defense Meritorious Service Medal
  Meritorious Service Medal with two gold stars
  Navy and Marine Corps Commendation Medal with gold star

References

This article contains information from the United States Federal Government and is in the public domain.

External links

Official biography

Living people
1951 births
American people of Irish descent
People from Rutland (city), Vermont
College of the Holy Cross alumni
Albany Law School alumni
College of Naval Command and Staff alumni
Harvard Kennedy School people
Recipients of the Legion of Merit
United States Navy vice admirals
Recipients of the Defense Distinguished Service Medal
Recipients of the Navy Distinguished Service Medal
Recipients of the Meritorious Service Medal (United States)